Courthouse of Tehran, also known as the Palace of Justice, is a historical courthouse in Tehran, Iran. The building was designed by Czechoslovak architect Stanislav Suva in the Neoclassical style to house 1,200 employees, serving as the Ministry of Justice, the law court, and the criminal and civil courts. Architecturally, the most important features of the building are the entrance hall, the main court hall, the offices and side rooms for the court, and the dining area and kitchen. Skoda began construction on the Palace of Justice between 1938 and 1946. Ing Arch Suva, a Czech architect who studied at the University of Architecture and Civil Engineering in Prague before being employed by "Société Iranienne Skoda", elaborated the sketch for the front face of the building in "European monumental conception".

It was necessary the architecture had a sense of permanence and a contemporaneous character in an Iranian style, which is intelligible to Iranian people but freed from excessive archaism. The designs for skirting parts had been elaborated by lead architect Suva and was entrusted to architect Tiyvoran. Architects Kopp and Jan Gabriel worked on the lining and embossing parts. Stone-dressing works and other craft-works, which were done by many Iranian workers, were managed by Czech experts and engineers.

During 1940 Suva was ordered to return to Prague, which was already occupied by Nazi Germany. He refused and was employed in the constructional department of the Ministry of Finance. Jan Gabriel, who worked out different architectural details on the front facade, the entrance door, and ceiling stucco in the interiors, previously worked on the Shah Opera, and afterwards on the Shah Spa in Balborsán.

Construction on the building was suspended during World War II during the reign of Reza Shah Pahlavi.

Today, the High Council of the Judiciary is based in this building.

Gallery

Buildings and structures in Tehran
Courthouses